Atopomelidae is a family of mites belonging to the order Sarcoptiformes.

Genera

Genera:
 Atellana Domrow, 1958
 Atopomelus Trouessart, 1918
 Austrobius Fain, 1971
 Austrochirus Womersley, 1943

References

Sarcoptiformes